"Beth" is a song by American rock band Kiss, originally released on their 1976 album Destroyer. Although drummer Peter Criss has gotten credit over the years for writing the song, he was not truly the composer. Criss had a hand in a demo called “Beck,” but his friend, Stan Penridge, was the main writer. Producer Bob Ezrin turned it into “Beth” for the album. Casablanca Records released it as a single in August 1976, after it was released as the B-side of "Detroit Rock City". "Beth" is Kiss's biggest commercial hit in the United States; it reached #7 on the Billboard Hot 100, received a Gold Record certification from the RIAA, and won the 1977 People's Choice Award for "Favorite Song". In 2003, "Beth" ranked #3 in VH1's 25 Greatest Power Ballads.

The demo,"Beck", was penned largely by Penridge when he and Peter Criss were in the band Chelsea. During the recording of Destroyer, Criss showed it to Ezrin, who rearranged it and changed the title to "Beth". The ballad has appeared on several compilations and live albums, including Kiss Unplugged (1996), where the group performed it acoustically.

Background
During drummer Peter Criss's time in Chelsea, he and the group's guitarist Stan Penridge decided to write a song that mocked a woman named Becky, the wife of their bandmate, Mike Brand. According to Criss, she regularly called the group during rehearsals to ask when her husband would come home, and this gave them the idea of composing the first verse of the song: "Beck, I hear you callin', but I can't come home right now. Me and the boys are playin', and we just can't find the sound". Criss has said he composed the song for his first wife, Lydia. That claim, however, has been refuted by several people, including Kiss bassist Gene Simmons, guitarist Paul Stanley, Ezrin, and Penridge.

By 1975, Kiss had released three studio albums, in which Criss's compositional contributions were minimal; the only track on which he appeared credited was the instrumental track "Love Theme from Kiss", written by the four members of the band and included on their self-titled debut. Criss assumed the role of vocalist in other songs created by his bandmates; however, for Destroyer, Criss set himself the goal of adding one of his own compositions. During a limousine ride, Criss sang a fast-paced version of "Beck" for Simmons and Stanley, assuming they would not be interested in including a sentimental ballad on the album. Simmons and Stanley suggested that he sing it to producer Bob Ezrin, who agreed to record it and assured him that it would be a success. Ezrin's decision was motivated by the fact that the band's other songs were primarily about sex, and he believed that "Beck" was a love song that "everyone would relate to".

Composition and recording
Ezrin made several arrangements of the song's melody and wrote part of the lyrics. Gene Simmons suggested changing the name to "Beth" because it would be easier to sing and to avoid confusion with Jeff Beck. However, Lydia Criss later claimed credit for proposing the change for the same reason, and because the original Becky had a twin sister named Beth.

In his autobiography, Simmons recounted that "I have never seen [Criss] compose a single song. Peter might have contributed a line or two of the lyrics, but after listening to Penridge's original demo, it's clear who made the original song". In 2014, during an interview for Rolling Stone, Paul Stanley agreed with Simmons's assessment that Penridge was the main writer, and he commented that Criss had nothing to do with the composition of "Beth", adding that "if you write one hit, you should be able to write two". Criss, in his defense, mentioned that Stanley was jealous because "he is the main vocalist of a group in which he did not write the greatest success. That's his problem. They hate the fact that I was the songwriter of a hit and won the People's Choice".

For the song's recording, Ezrin brought the New York Philharmonic orchestra and musician Dick Wagner into the A&R studio as a substitute for Ace Frehley. According to Criss and Simmons, Frehley did not participate in the recording because he was engaged in playing cards with friends. Once the orchestra arrived at the studio, Ezrin suggested that all 25 members wear fake tuxedos and that Criss appear in the studio in his trademark makeup so he could take some pictures. For his part, Ezrin put on a top hat and played the grand piano. Finally, Criss recorded the vocals at the Record Plant studio.

Structurally, "Beth" lacks a solo; instead, the mid-octave section repeats the intro along with the chorus in an orchestral interlude. The sound of the violin and viola, led by the cello, change the key from C major to A minor and then the trumpets, tubas, trombones and French horns enter, accentuating the hook.

The song was a last-minute addition to the Destroyer album. According to Bill Aucoin, the manager of Kiss at that time, Simmons and Stanley did not want "Beth" on the album because it was not a typical Kiss song. Aucoin insisted on keeping the song on the record. During recording, Criss was the only band member in the studio, making "Beth" the only Kiss song to have no instrumentals from any member of the band. Criss was backed by a recording of a piano and harp, a dramatic departure from the band's usual hard rock sound.

Release
Casablanca Records released "Beth" in August 1976 as Destroyers fourth single. The album, released on March 4, peaked at #11 on the Billboard 200, but quickly began to decline. Its first two singles, "Shout It Out Loud" and "Flaming Youth", failed to match "Rock and Roll All Nite" - until then the group's most successful song in the United States - and Casablanca Records executives had to choose another song from the album to release as a single. Casablanca president Neil Bogart asked promoter and disc jockey Scott Shannon for his honest opinion on which of Destroyers tracks was a potential hit. To his surprise, Shannon chose "Beth", although Bogart asked him to forget it because he felt the song had only been included as a favor to Peter Criss. In the face of Bogart's refusal, Shannon contacted vice president Larry Harris, who revealed that Bogart disliked "Beth" because it was his ex-wife's name and he felt the lyrics reflected the process of their divorce.

Before the release of the third single, Bogart took a vacation in Acapulco, but not before giving the order to release "Beth" as the B-side of the next single, in order to reduce its chances of commercial success. During Bogart's absence, "Detroit Rock City" was released as a single, accompanied by "Beth", and was sent out to radio stations. To the bewilderment of the Casablanca executives, the jockeys chose to broadcast "Beth". The song soon became one of the most requested by listeners, and Harris made the decision to reissue the single with "Beth" as side A. One significant contributor to "Beth"'s popularity was Rosalie Trombley, at the time the music director at "The Big 8" CKLW in Windsor, Ontario, immediately across the Detroit River from Detroit, Michigan. Trombley's daughter had a copy of "Detroit Rock City", but was hooked on "Beth" and convinced Trombley to add it to CKLW's playlist. After "Beth" became a hit, Kiss presented Trombley's daughter with a gold record. Upon Bogart's return, he was forced to accept the situation due to the song's positive commercial reception. "Beth" reached #7 on the US chart, the best in Kiss' career, and achieved a gold record certification from the RIAA on January 5, 1977. The impact of the song boosted Destroyers sales and enabled the album to go platinum. "Beth" received the award for Favorite Song at the 1977 People's Choice Awards.

The song's television debut was on The Paul Lynde Halloween Special on October 29, 1976, where Criss lip-synced a shortened version of the song while miming on piano.  Live, "Beth" was performed by Criss alone on stage backed by a tape of the instrumental track. The acoustic version featured on Kiss Unplugged is the only recording with members of Kiss solely backing up Criss. The version of "Beth" featured on the group's 2003 Kiss Symphony: Alive IV DVD and subsequent album would be the only time the song was performed live with an ensemble. In 2010, the song was performed live for the first time with Eric Singer on acoustic guitar during their Sonic Boom Over Europe Tour and again on their The Hottest Show on Earth Tour in 2011. It has since been again removed from setlists, but the band occasionally performs the song at meet and greet sessions. On the 2019 End of the Road World Tour, the song has been performed by Singer, miming it on the piano.

Re-Recording
At the time of the release of KISS's 1988 compilation album, Smashes, Thrashes & Hits, Eric Carr had replaced Peter Criss as the band's drummer. A re-recording of "Beth" was produced just for this greatest hits album with Carr singing the vocals in the same room of the Record Plant studio where the song was originally recorded. This recording used the same backing track as Criss.

Chart performance

Weekly charts

Year-end charts

Sales certifications

Personnel
Peter Criss: lead vocals 
Bob Ezrin: piano and production
Dick Wagner: acoustic guitar
New York Philharmonic: orchestra

Appearances on Kiss albums
"Beth" appears on the following Kiss albums:
Destroyer
Alive II – Live version
Double Platinum
Smashes, Thrashes & Hits – with drummer Eric Carr re-recording the lead vocal
Kiss Unplugged – Live acoustic version
You Wanted the Best, You Got the Best!!
Greatest Kiss
The Box Set
The Very Best of Kiss
20th Century Masters – The Millennium Collection: The Best of Kiss
Kiss Symphony: Alive IV – Live version
Gold: 1974–1982 – Sound & Vision
Gold
Ikons

References

Bibliography

External links
 KISS: United States Singles Discography
 The Complete KISS Singles Chart Action
 Radio Revolution: Rise and Fall of the Big 8. Dir. Michael McNamara.  Markham Street Films, 2004. Film
 SongFacts: "Beth"
 

1976 songs
1976 singles
Kiss (band) songs
1970s ballads
Casablanca Records singles
American soft rock songs
Rock ballads
Song recordings produced by Bob Ezrin
Songs written by Bob Ezrin